Alessandra Corti (born 28 December 1961) is a former Italian female middle-distance runner and cross-country runner who competed at individual senior level at the World Athletics Cross Country Championships (1986).

References

External links
 

1961 births
Living people
Italian female middle-distance runners
Italian female cross country runners
People from Seregno
Sportspeople from the Province of Monza e Brianza